Elvedina Muzaferija (born 20 August 1999) is a female alpine skier from Bosnia and Herzegovina. She carried her nation's flag at the 2018 Winter Olympics opening ceremony.

Biography
She was the first woman from Bosnia and Herzegovina to appear in downhill. On 10 February 2020, she achieved her best result in European Cup in Crans-Montana, Switzerland taking the 10th place in Super-G. On 15 February 2021 she finished 16th in World Cup, which is the best placement of any Bosnian alpine skiers in the country's history.

She was also the first alpine skier from Bosnia and Herzegovina to score points in the World Cup even though she has not received much support from Bosnian Ski association.

World Cup results

Season standings

Results per discipline
	

	
Standings through 5 March 2023

World Championship results

Olympic results

Other results

European Cup results

Season standings

Results per discipline

Standings through 5 March 2023

Race podiums
 1 podium – (1 DH)

References

External links
 
 

Alpine skiers at the 2018 Winter Olympics
Alpine skiers at the 2022 Winter Olympics
1999 births
Living people
People from Visoko
Olympic alpine skiers of Bosnia and Herzegovina
Bosnia and Herzegovina female alpine skiers
Alpine skiers at the 2016 Winter Youth Olympics